Leonard Seth Bathurst (born 1 May 1959) is an English former professional footballer who played as a midfielder.

Bathurst began his career at Stockport County in 1977, going on to play for Northampton Town, Rochdale and Crewe Alexandra before finishing his career at non-league Winsford United.

Since his retirement in 1990, Bathurst has owned a pub in Northwich.

References 

Sportspeople from Northwich
English footballers
Association football midfielders
Stockport County F.C. players
Northampton Town F.C. players
Rochdale A.F.C. players
Crewe Alexandra F.C. players
English Football League players
1959 births
Living people
Winsford United F.C. players